Paseo Acoxpa is an outdoor shopping center of   opened in 2010 in colonia Ex-Hacienda Coapa, in Tlalpan borough, Mexico City. It is located on the Calzada de Acoxpa east of the Calzada de Tlalpan. It was developed by Grupo Arquitech, with an investment of 100 million U.S. dollars. Tenants include: Best Buy, El Grupo Palacio de Hierro present in the formats "Boutique Palacio" and "Casa Palacio", Sport City, Cinépolis, Nike, Deportes Martí, and California Pizza Kitchen.

References

Shopping malls in Greater Mexico City
Shopping malls established in 2010
2010 establishments in Mexico